Rowdy Branch is a stream located entirely within Perry County, Kentucky.

According to tradition, Rowdy Branch was so named on account of the "rowdy" settlers who lived near it.

See also
List of rivers of Kentucky

References

Rivers of Perry County, Kentucky
Rivers of Kentucky